Boomerang Fu is a fighting game developed and published by Cranky Watermelon. The game was released for Windows, Nintendo Switch, and Xbox One on August 13, 2020. The game released for PlayStation 4 and PlayStation 5 on January 13, 2022. In the game, players control anthropomorphic food-based characters armed with boomerangs and various superpowers. Boomerang Fu received generally favorable reviews.

Gameplay 

In Boomerang Fu, players control food-themed characters armed with boomerangs. Players can either throw the boomerangs or use them as melee weapons. Thrown boomerangs will fall to the floor if it hits an object. Dropped boomerangs can be recalled by the player. Each character can only be hit once. The game has over 30 different arenas. To earn a point, the player or players have to be the last one standing. It can be played in single-player against AI-controlled opponents. The game also supports local multiplayer, allowing up to six players per match. Power-ups can be picked up during matches, and provide permanent upgrades for as long as it lasts.

Development and release 

Boomerang Fu was one of 13 ID@Xbox games announced for the Xbox One. It was also one of the 30 games featured at Microsoft's booth at the 2019 Game Developers Conference. The game's release date was announced on July 9, 2020. On August 13, the game was released on Microsoft Windows, Xbox One, and Nintendo Switch. The game later released on PlayStation 4 and PlayStation 5 on January 13, 2022.

Reception 

Boomerang Fu received "generally favorable" reviews according to review aggregator Metacritic.

Ollie Reynolds from Nintendo Life rated the game 7/10 stars, praising the premise, gameplay, and power-ups. However, Reynolds criticized the lack of online multiplayer and the few game modes.  

Maria Alexander from Gamezebo rated the game 4/5 stars, calling the game's presentation "adorable". However, Alexander was disappointed by the lack of online multiplayer.

Awards and nominations 
Boomerang Fu received the award for Best Gameplay at the 2020 Australian Game Developer Awards. The game was also nominated for Best Sound and Game of the Year, but lost to Audioplay: Alien Strike and Moving Out, respectively. It also received a nomination for Best Sound for Interactive Media at the 2020 Australian Screen Sound Guild Awards.

References 

 Notes

 References

External links 

 Official website

2020 video games
Fighting games
Indie video games
Multiplayer and single-player video games
Nintendo Switch games
Party video games
PlayStation 4 games
PlayStation 5 games
Video games about food and drink
Video games developed in Australia
Windows games
Xbox One games